The 2021 Marshall Thundering Herd football team represented Marshall University during the 2021 NCAA Division I FBS football season. The Thundering Herd played their home games at the Joan C. Edwards Stadium in Huntington, West Virginia, and competed in the East Division of Conference USA (CUSA). The team was coached by first-year head coach Charles Huff.

On October 30, 2021, Marshall announced they would become a member of the Sun Belt Conference. On March 29, it was announced they would officially join on July 1, 2022, making this the final season competing in C-USA.

Previous season

The Thundering Herd finished the 2020 regular season 7–3 and 4–1 in C–USA play to finish in first in the East Division. They competed in the conference championship game and the Camellia Bowl, which the team lost in both to end the season. On January 4, 2021, coach Doc Holliday, announced that his contract with Marshall had not been renewed and that he was out as head coach.

Schedule 
Marshall announced its 2021 football schedule on January 27, 2021. The 2021 schedule consists of 6 home and 6 away games in the regular season.

Schedule Source:

Game summaries

at Navy

North Carolina Central

East Carolina

at Appalachian State

at Middle Tennessee

Old Dominion

at North Texas

FIU

at Florida Atlantic

UAB

at Charlotte

Western Kentucky

vs Louisiana

Players drafted into the NFL

References

Marshall
Marshall Thundering Herd football seasons
Marshall Thundering Herd football